Lorene Scafaria (born 1978) is an American filmmaker, playwright, musician, and former actress. She is best known for writing and directing the films Seeking a Friend for the End of the World (2012), The Meddler (2015), and Hustlers (2019). She also wrote the film Nick & Norah's Infinite Playlist (2008) and directed the Succession episode "Too Much Birthday" (2021), with the latter earning her nominations for the Primetime Emmy Award for Outstanding Directing for a Drama Series and the Directors Guild of America Award for Outstanding Directorial Achievement in Dramatic Series.

Early life
Scafaria was born in 1978 in Holmdel, New Jersey, the daughter of Canadian-American mother Gail (née Kiernan) and Italian father Joseph Scafaria (1939–2009). Her father came from Gioia Tauro. She has a brother named Vincent. She first became interested in writing when she began making a book report on a fake book once a month in order to win Pizza Hut gift certificates from her school. By the age of 17, she had written and staged her first play in Red Bank, New Jersey. After graduating from Holmdel High School in 1995, she attended Lafayette College in Easton, Pennsylvania. Unable to afford Lafayette's tuition fees, she soon transferred to Montclair State University in Montclair, New Jersey, where she earned a BA in English with a minor in theater.

Career
After moving to New York City, Scafaria wrote and directed a play at the Producer's Club Theatre called That Guy and Others Like Him, in which she also acted. She had a small role in the acclaimed short film Bullet in the Brain, which won awards at festivals and was produced by CJ Follini. Her writing agent had still yet to find her a job, so she took on more acting roles, appearing in many theater productions in addition to films such as Big Helium Dog and A Million Miles. Seeking new representation for her writing career, she sent out queries to 20 different agents; one of the agents who replied said that they required her to move to Los Angeles. Although she did not anticipate real success with the agent, she moved there and became roommates with screenwriter Bryan Sipe, whom she had previously met while making a film in her native New Jersey. Neither of their work was considered "commercial" enough by studios, so they paired up to write a children's adventure film called Legend Has It. The screenplay was purchased by Revolution Studios; however, after the studio asked the pair to make changes to the script which Scafaria described as "far less interesting", the project was shelved.

In 2005, Scafaria was hired by Focus Features to the book Nick & Norah's Infinite Playlist into a film of the same name. It was her ninth screenplay but her first adaptation. She told Moviemaker, "I grew up in suburban New Jersey, so I immediately identified with the characters, especially Norah. Everything from feeling uncomfortable in my own skin to having a father who's larger than life (even if only in your mind), her plight really spoke to me and seemed like it would speak to a lot of young girls. It wasn't hard to get inside the characters' heads—the authors' voices are so strong." She said the film Before Sunrise was a big inspiration for the structure of her adaptation and said that she wanted to bring a nostalgic take on the teen comedy: "It was just a real challenge to kind of bring it back to those movies that I grew up on in the '80s, John Hughes movies and Cameron Crowe."

In 2012, the "Fempire" (a trio of writers consisting of Scafaria and her close friends Diablo Cody and Liz Meriwether) received the Athena Film Festival Award for Creativity and Sisterhood. Scafaria wrote the Iraq War docudrama Sweet Relief for Paramount Pictures and The Mighty Flynn, a spec script which she set up at Warner Brothers. She also wrote the film Man and Wife, which Gabriele Muccino is attached to direct.

During the 2007–2008 Writers Guild of America strike, Scafaria recorded an album called Garden Party, featuring original songs she sang and played on the piano. The 2009 film Whip It! features her song "28" in the closing credits. She released her second album, Laughter and Forgetting, in April 2010.

In 2009, Mandate Pictures bought Scafaria's script Seeking a Friend for the End of the World, a romantic comedy focusing on a man's quest for a meaningful connection during the apocalypse. It was the first film Scafaria also directed, and was released in June 2012. In an interview, she said, "Two people at the end of the world—all the chaos that's around them that they're sort of wheeling through—and obviously some people are just mowing their lawn and other people are doing heroin... but there's something to me that becomes even more romantic, and that's what I was excited to explore and see. I love relationships. I love intimate stories about people; whether it's a guy and a girl or whatever it is, I like intimate stories of people and how they relate to each other."

In 2015, Scafaria wrote and directed the comedy-drama film The Meddler. The film tells the story of a mother and daughter trying to move on with life after the loss of their husband and father. Scafaria told the New York Times, "There's a reason that it's all from [the daughter] Marnie's perspective because I never wanted to get a break from her. More than anything I wanted it to inspire empathy from people who might find themselves in this situation, whether it's through loss or some other circumstance that creates strife. Once I started showing people the script, that there was something so relatable about being the adult child of someone and trying to stay best friends."

In 2019, Scafaria wrote and directed the crime drama film Hustlers, which was based on a 2015 New York magazine article by Jessica Pressler. The film is about an American woman born to Cambodian immigrants who is deserted and forced to stay with her grandparents. The film was a critical and commercial success. Scafaria said to Vox on the real story, "There are a lot of movies that I think have touched upon these themes—The Wolf of Wall Street or movies like The Big Short—which explain [financial downturns] from the bullpen. But I'm really interested in seeing the impact that the 2008 recession had on these women who worked in Wall Street's backyard." When mentioning the relationship between Destiny and Ramona, she said, "It felt like there was something more in between the lines—the story of these two women who became friends and formed this business together, and then here they are being interviewed separately years later." In a 2019 interview, the real-life stripper who went through the events of the film told her side of the story and discussed how accurate it was while praising Scafaria.

In 2021, Scafaria directed the Succession episode "Too Much Birthday", for which she received a Directors Guild of America Award nomination for Outstanding Directorial Achievement in Dramatic Series as well as a Primetime Emmy Award nomination for Outstanding Directing for a Drama Series.

Personal life
Scafaria lives in Los Angeles and has been in a relationship with comedian Bo Burnham since 2013. His special Inside (2021) was dedicated to her, featuring the text "for lor, for everything" in the end credits.

Filmography

Films

Television

Awards and nominations

References

External links

American women film directors
American film actresses
Screenwriters from New Jersey
Holmdel High School alumni
Lafayette College alumni
Living people
Montclair State University alumni
People from Holmdel Township, New Jersey
American women screenwriters
American women dramatists and playwrights
American writers of Italian descent
People of Calabrian descent
Film directors from New Jersey
20th-century American actresses
21st-century American actresses
21st-century American screenwriters
21st-century American dramatists and playwrights
21st-century American women writers
American people of Italian descent
1978 births